USS Jerry Briggs was a United States Navy patrol vessel in commission from 1918 to 1919.

Jerry Briggs was built as the private motorboat Rosalinda. She was renamed Jerry Briggs while in civilian use. In 1918, the U.S. Navy acquired Jerry Briggs under a free lease from her owner, Mrs. Myra Briggs, for use as a section patrol boat during World War I. She never received a section patrol (SP) number, but she was commissioned as USS Jerry Briggs on 17 August 1918.

Jerry Briggs operated out of Saint Helena oil station in the South Atlantic Ocean for the rest of World War I and into 1919. She was decommissioned on 3 April 1919 returned to Briggs the same day.

References
 
 Jerry Briggs at Department of the Navy Naval History and Heritage Command Online Library of Selected Images: U.S. Navy Ships -- Listed by Hull Number "SP" #s and "ID" #s -- World War I Era Vessels without Numbers (listed alphabetically by name)
 NavSource Online: Section Patrol Craft Photo Archive Jerry Briggs

Patrol vessels of the United States Navy
World War I patrol vessels of the United States